The 1959–60 William & Mary Indians men's basketball team represented the College of William & Mary in intercollegiate basketball during the 1959–60 NCAA University Division men's basketball season. Under the third year of head coach Bill Chambers, the team finished the season 15–11 and 10–5 in the Southern Conference. William & Mary played its home games at Blow Gymnasium. This was the 55th season of the collegiate basketball program at William & Mary, whose nickname is now the Tribe.

The Indians finished in 3rd place in the conference and qualified for the 1960 Southern Conference men's basketball tournament, held at the Richmond Arena. William & Mary defeated Furman in the quarterfinals before losing in the semifinals to top-seeded West Virginia.

Program notes
William & Mary played one team for the first time this season: Duquesne.
Jeff Cohen, for the second consecutive year, was also named to the first team all-Southern Conference. Ben Vaughan was named to the second team.

Schedule

|-
!colspan=9 style="background:#006400; color:#FFD700;"| Regular season

|-
!colspan=9 style="background:#006400; color:#FFD700;"| 1960 Southern Conference Basketball Tournament

Source

References

William & Mary Tribe men's basketball seasons
William and Mary Indians
William and Mary Indians Men's Basketball Team
1959 in sports in Virginia